Mohammed Salisu Bamba (born September 17, 1975) is a Ghanaian politician and member of the Sixth Parliament of the Fourth Republic of Ghana representing the Ejura-Sekyedumase Constituency in the Ashanti Region on the ticket of the New Patriotic Party.

Early life and education 
Bamba was born on September 17, 1975. He hails from Yendi, a town in the Northern Region of Ghana. He attended the University of Ghana and obtained his Bachelor of Arts degree in Psychology. He is a Muslim and is married with two children.

Politics 
Bamba is a member of the New Patriotic Party (NPP). In 2012, he contested for the Ejura-Sekyedumase seat on the ticket of the NPP in the 2012 Ghanaian general elections and won. During the elections, he garnered 21,461 votes which represents 49.78% of the total valid votes cast and hence defeated the other contestants. However, in 2016, he contested for the seat again and lost in the 2016 Ghanaian general elections, and as a result, he could represent his constituency for the second time.

References 

Living people
1975 births
People from Yendi
University of Ghana alumni
New Patriotic Party politicians
Ghanaian MPs 2013–2017
Ghanaian Muslims